Leucanopsis squalida is a moth of the subfamily Arctiinae. It was described by Gottlieb August Wilhelm Herrich-Schäffer in 1855. It is found in Brazil and Bolivia.

References

 

squalida
Moths described in 1855